Marina Szendey (born 8 July 1971) is a Hungarian archer. She competed in the women's individual and team events at the 1992 Summer Olympics.

References

1971 births
Living people
Hungarian female archers
Olympic archers of Hungary
Archers at the 1992 Summer Olympics
Sportspeople from Budapest